Maria Filomena Dumandan Singh (born June 25, 1966) is a Filipino judge who serves as associate justice of the Supreme Court of the Philippines since 2022.

Early life and education
Singh was born on June 25, 1966. She graduated from the University of the Philippines, cum laude, with a Bachelor of Arts in English major in imaginative writing. She earned a Juris Doctor from the Ateneo Law School with second honors distinction. She studied at the Washington College of Law of the American University in Washington, D.C., for a Master of Laws in International Legal Studies.

Judicial career
Singh served as an associate justice of the Court of Appeals of the Philippines from 2014 to 2022, succeeding Justice Rosalinda Asuncion-Vicente who retired in November 2013. She previously served as the senior member in the 3rd Division of the Court of Appeals under the chairpersonship of Justice Fernanda Lampas-Peralta.

On May 18, 2022, Singh was appointed by President Rodrigo Duterte as an associate justice of the Supreme Court of the Philippines to fill the vacancy left by the retirement of Justice Estela Perlas-Bernabe. Singh is Duterte's last appointment to the Supreme Court.

References

1966 births
Living people
Place of birth missing (living people)
Associate Justices of the Supreme Court of the Philippines
Ateneo de Manila University alumni
Filipino women judges
Filipino women lawyers
Justices of the Court of Appeals of the Philippines
Washington College of Law alumni
21st-century women judges